Patti or Petti in Iran may refer to:
 Petti, Chabahar
 Patti, Dashtiari, Chabahar County
 Petti Mohammad Jadgal, Chabahar County